The Oklahoma Sooners football program is a college football team that represents the University of Oklahoma (variously "Oklahoma" or "OU"). The team is a member of the Big 12 Conference, which is in Division I Football Bowl Subdivision (formerly Division I-A) of the National Collegiate Athletic Association (NCAA). The program began in 1895 and is one of the most successful in history, having won 934 games and possessing a .725 winning percentage, both sixth all time. As of the end of the 2022 season, Oklahoma has appeared in the AP poll 882 times, including 101 No. 1 rankings, both third all time.

The program claims seven national championships, 50 conference championships, 167 first-team All-Americans (82 consensus), and seven Heisman Trophy winners. In addition, the school has had 29 former players and coaches inducted into the College Football Hall of Fame and holds the record for the longest winning streak in Division I history with 47 straight victories. Oklahoma is also the only program with which four coaches have won more than 100 games each.

The Sooners play their home games at Gaylord Family Oklahoma Memorial Stadium in Norman, Oklahoma. Brent Venables is the head coach and has served since 2022.

On July 26, 2021, while showing interest in joining the Southeastern Conference (SEC), the University of Oklahoma and the University of Texas sent a joint letter of intent to the Big 12 Conference stating that they do not intend to extend their media rights contracts with the conference, which are set to expire after the 2024 season. In February 2023, the Big 12 announced that the schools had negotiated a combined $100 million early termination fee in order to leave for the SEC in 2024, prior to the expiration of the media rights deals and a year earlier than initially intended.

History

Early history (1895–1904)
The first football game in the university's history was played on December 14, 1895, 12 years before Oklahoma became a state. The team was organized by John A. Harts, a student from Winfield, Kansas who had played the game in his home state. Oklahoma was shut out 34–0 by a more experienced team from the Oklahoma City High School in what was the Sooners' only game that season. Oklahoma failed to record a first down throughout the entire game, which was played on a field of low prairie grass just Northwest of the current site of Holmberg Hall. Several members of the Oklahoma team were injured, including Harts; by the end of the game, the Oklahoma team was borrowing members from the opposing squad so they would have a full lineup. After that year, Harts left Oklahoma to become a gold prospector.

After playing two games without a coach in 1896, a professor named Vernon Louis Parrington became head coach in 1897. Parrington had played football at Harvard and was more exposed to the game, having come from the East Coast. In his four years as head coach, Parrington's teams recorded nine wins, two losses, and one tie. After the 1900 season, football began interfering with Parrington's teaching, and he stepped down as head coach. He would go on to win the Pulitzer Prize for History in 1928 at the University of Washington.

The Sooners had three more coaches over the next four seasons, beginning with Fred Roberts, who led the Sooners to a 3–2 record in 1901. Mark McMahon followed, finishing 11–7–3 in his two years as coach in 1902 and 1903. Fred Ewing followed McMahon, achieving a 4–3–1 record in 1904. The 1904 season marked the first game between Oklahoma and in-state rival Oklahoma A&M. The game was played on November 6 at Mineral Wells Park in Guthrie, Oklahoma, with Oklahoma winning 75–0. The game was the first football matchup in the Bedlam Series, the athletic rivalry between the University of Oklahoma and Oklahoma State University.

Bennie Owen era (1905–1926)
After a decade of football, the program acquired its first long-term head coach in Bennie Owen, a former quarterback of the undefeated 1899 Kansas Jayhawks team led by coach Fielding H. Yost. Owen had previously coached under Yost at Michigan, and his Bethany College teams had defeated Oklahoma in 1903 and 1904.

Owen's first two years at Oklahoma were spent between Norman and Arkansas City since Oklahoma lacked a large enough budget to employ him all year. As a result of these budgetary limitations, Owen would occasionally schedule up to three road games in a single short trip, exhausting his players in the process. However, even early in his tenure, Owen's teams found success. In 1905, Oklahoma won its first victory over rival Texas, winning the eighth meeting between the two schools by a 2–0 margin. In 1908, the Sooners went 8–1–1, losing only to the undefeated Kansas Jayhawks. Owen's 1908 team relied on hand-offs to large runners, as the forward pass was just becoming common. In contrast, his 1911 team had several small and fast players that the quarterback would pass to directly. That team finished 8–0.

Oklahoma had undefeated seasons in 1915 and 1918. In 1920, the Sooners moved to the Missouri Valley Intercollegiate Athletic Association after three seasons in the Southwest Conference, of which it was a founding member. In the new conference, they went 6–0–1, tying only Kansas State. Owen retired after the 1926 season. During his 22-year career at Oklahoma, he went 122–54–16 (.677), won three conference championships, and achieved four undefeated seasons. In 1951, the inaugural year of the College Football Hall of Fame, he became Oklahoma's first inductee.

Between Owen and Wilkinson (1927–1946)
In 1927, Adrian Lindsey became Oklahoma's first new head coach in over two decades. Like Owen, Lindsey had played football at Kansas and been the head coach at Bethany College prior to his arrival in Norman. However, he was unable to achieve Owen's success, resigning quietly after a five-year tenure. The Sooners achieved a notable win in 1930, defeating Nebraska 20–7 in the Cornhuskers' worst in-conference loss in two decades. Despite this achievement, Lindsey finished an inconsistent stint in Norman with a 19–19–6 record.

Following Lindsey's resignation, Owen, who had remained Oklahoma's athletic director after his retirement from coaching, hired hired Vanderbilt backfield coach Lewie Hardage as head coach. Upon his hire, Hardage emphasized speed by fabricating new lighter uniforms and trimming the grass on Owen Field. However, in three seasons he failed to produce a successful team. His final record at Oklahoma was 11–12–4, making him the first coach in program history with a losing record aside from John A. Harts, who only coached a single game.

Although the next head coach, Lawrence "Biff" Jones, went an unspectacular 9–6–3 across two seasons, his impact on the athletic department's administration and finances was significant. Jones was inducted into the College Football Hall of Fame in 1954 following a career that also included coaching stints at Army, LSU, and Nebraska. After his departure from Norman, assistant coach Tom Stidham became head coach. In 1938, Stidham led the team to a 10–1 record, a fourth-place finish in the final AP poll, and the first bowl game in school history, a 17–0 Orange Bowl loss to undefeated Tennessee. Although Stidham's other teams would not be as successful, he left Oklahoma after four seasons with a .750 winning percentage, the highest of any coach since Vernon Louis Parrington (.792).

Stidham left for Marquette in 1941, and assistant coach Dewey "Snorter" Luster succeeded him. After Luster's first season, a 6–3 campaign, with the United States having entered World War II, many players left the team to join the military. The Sooners regressed to a 3–5–2 record in 1942 but rebounded to finish 7–2 in 1943 and 6–3–1 in 1944. Luster stepped down after the 1945 season due to ill health. He attained a 27–18–3 record in five seasons at Oklahoma, and his teams never finished below second place in the Big Six. However, despite two conference championships, the Sooners were not invited to a bowl game during Luster's tenure.

After Luster's resignation, several candidates were interviewed for the head coaching job, among them North Carolina native Jim Tatum. Tatum was joined at his interview by his assistant, Bud Wilkinson, with whom athletic director Lawrence Haskell was more impressed. However, it was decided that usurping Tatum and giving the job to Wilkinson would be unethical. Tatum was hired as head coach, with Wilkinson joining the staff as an assistant, over several other coaches, including Bear Bryant. The 1946 season saw the Sooners finish 8–3, including a 73–12 Bedlam Series win and a victory over NC State in the Gator Bowl. Tatum left Oklahoma after one season to accept the head coach position at Maryland.

Bud Wilkinson era (1947–1963)

Following Tatum's departure, Bud Wilkinson was promoted to head coach.
In his first season, the Sooners went 7–2–1 and shared the conference title with Kansas for the second year in a row. Over the next two years, Oklahoma lost only a single game and went undefeated in conference play, winning two straight Sugar Bowls. In 1949, despite going undefeated and winning the Sugar Bowl, the Sooners were not awarded the national championship, which went to the Notre Dame Fighting Irish, though they did not play in a bowl game. At the time, however, most major championship selectors, including the AP and Coaches Polls, did not consider bowl game results when deciding their champion.

In 1950, Wilkinson guided the Sooners to their first national championship, though they lost the Sugar Bowl to Bear Bryant's Kentucky team. That loss was the Sooners' first since a season-opening defeat to Santa Clara in 1948, 31 games earlier. The team's success began to influence the culture of football at the university. "People talk a lot about the tradition of football at Oklahoma. The person who started that tradition was Bud Wilkinson," Oklahoma native and Hall of Fame wide receiver Steve Largent later said. In 1951, while seeking funding to improve the school, university president George Lynn Cross told the Oklahoma legislature that he "would like to build a university of which the football team would be proud."

In 1952, Oklahoma had its first Heisman Trophy winner in halfback Billy Vessels, a local player from Cleveland, Oklahoma. Vessels became the first thousand-yard rusher to win the Heisman and scored 18 touchdowns for the Sooners, who finished 8–1–1, their only loss coming on the road to Notre Dame. The 1953 team would open the season with a loss to the Fighting Irish and a tie with Pitt.

47-game winning streak
The Sooners went undefeated for the remainder of the 1953 season, culminating in an Orange Bowl victory over national champions Maryland, coached by Jim Tatum. They went 10–0 in 1954 and 11–0 in 1955, concluding the latter season with another Orange Bowl win over Tatum and Maryland. The Sooners won the national championship in 1955 and repeated the feat in 1956, when they went 10–0, including a 40–0 rout of Notre Dame that marked the 35th win in the streak.

At the start of the 1957 season, with the streak standing at 40 games, speculation arose that the team was not as good as it had been in previous years, having lost 18 lettermen from 1956. Wilkinson commented that "this year we'll have to work faster and organize better than ever before." The Sooners won their first seven games that year, but fell to Notre Dame on November 16, suffering their first defeat in more than three years.

The record of 47 consecutive wins has never been seriously threatened; since it ended, no FBS school has achieved a streak longer than 35 wins. During the streak, the Sooners outscored their opponents 1620–269 and recorded 23 shutouts. In addition to their back-to-back national championships during the streak, the Sooners won 14 straight conference titles from 1946 to 1959, one under Jim Tatum and 13 under Wilkinson. Oklahoma went undefeated in conference play from November 23, 1946, to October 31, 1959; their record was only blemished by two ties.

Dominance and decline
Wilkinson's best teams came during the first 11 years of his tenure. In that time, he recorded winning streaks of 31 and 47 games and went 114–10–3 for a .909 winning percentage. After a pair of one-loss seasons in 1957 and 1958, the Sooners fell to 7–3 in 1959, then 3–6–1 in 1960. Oklahoma would finish that season unranked, the first time that they had done so under Wilkinson. They finished unranked in 1961 as well, and although they rebounded to secure a conference championship in 1962, the Sooners were unable to replicate the success of the previous decade. Wilkinson retired from coaching after the 1963 season, finishing with a record of 145–29–4, 14 conference titles, and 123 straight games without being shut out. He was elected to the College Football Hall of Fame in 1969.

Prentice Gautt
During Wilkinson's tenure, Prentice Gautt became the first black football player at the University of Oklahoma. Gautt had been a superior student in high school, where during his junior and senior years he had helped his team amass a 31-game winning streak. He was also the first black player to participate in the Oklahoma state all-star game. Some members of Gautt's team did not want to play with him; one player even left Oklahoma because he refused to play with an African American. However, most of the team had his support. After a freshman game in Tulsa, when Gautt was refused service at a restaurant, his teammates left and found a restaurant that would serve him. Gautt was twice named to the All-Conference team and scored a touchdown in the 1959 Orange Bowl.

Jones, Mackenzie, and Fairbanks (1964–1972)

Following Wilkinson's retirement, his assistant coach, Gomer Jones, was promoted to head coach, a move supported by Wilkinson. His first year was a sharp contrast from Wilkinson's early years; the Sooners went 6–4–1. Less than a month before the team's Gator Bowl loss to Florida State, it was discovered that four starters had signed professional football contracts before their college eligibility had expired, and they were dismissed from the team.

Following a 3–7 season in his second year as head coach, Oklahoma's worst record since its inaugural season in 1895, Jones was replaced by Arkansas assistant Jim Mackenzie. Seeking discipline from his players, Mackenzie set a curfew and required them to enroll in a physical education class. His first team went 6–4, including a win in the Red River Showdown over a rival Texas team coached by former Oklahoma defensive back Darrell Royal, their first win over Texas since 1957. They also beat rival Nebraska, then ranked fourth in the nation, by a score of 10–9. On April 28, 1967, at the age of 37, Mackenzie died of a heart attack.

Assistant coach Chuck Fairbanks succeeded Mackenzie, and in 1967, the Sooners went 10–1, including a 26–24 win over second-ranked Tennessee in the Orange Bowl. The Sooners finished the season ranked third in the country. The Sooners lost four games in each of the next three seasons, with highlights including Steve Owens becoming the Sooners' second Heisman Trophy winner in 1969.

The wishbone offense

In the 1970s, several college football teams began implementing the wishbone offense, a run-based scheme designed to expand the possibilities of the option offense by placing three rushers in the backfield behind the quarterback. In a traditional option play, the quarterback determines which rusher carries the ball by reading the alignment of the defense. The wishbone relies on the triple option, in which the quarterback has three potential candidates to carry the ball (himself and two backfield rushers). One innovation of the wishbone was to place a third rusher in the backfield to serve as a lead blocker. Head coach Fairbanks and offensive coordinator Barry Switzer were among the early adopters of the wishbone and used it to widespread success in Norman. Their 1970 team tied an Alabama squad that also used the wishbone in the Astro-Bluebonnet Bowl. During the next season, the Sooners beat No. 17 USC, No. 3 Texas and No. 6 Colorado in consecutive weeks. After these wins, Oklahoma was ranked second in the country ahead of a "Game of the Century" matchup against top-ranked Nebraska. On November 25, Nebraska edged Oklahoma, 35–31, Oklahoma's only loss of the season. Nebraska went on to win the national championship with a 13–0 record, while Oklahoma went on to beat No. 5 Auburn in the Sugar Bowl to finish the season ranked second. Led by quarterback Jack Mildren and running back Greg Pruitt, Oklahoma's wishbone offense averaged 44.5 points per game, at the time the second most in team history. The offense gained 472.36 rushing yards per game, an FBS record that still stands. Pruitt averaged nine yards per carry, and Mildren's performance led to his adopting the moniker "the Godfather of the Wishbone."

In 1972, the Sooners went 11–1, finishing the year at No. 2 after a Sugar Bowl victory over Penn State. Following the season, Fairbanks left Oklahoma to become the head coach of the New England Patriots.

Barry Switzer era (1973–1988)

Switzer ascended to head coach following the departure of Fairbanks. His tenure began with a scandal when the university self-reported violations involving the alteration of a player's high school transcript. Although the Sooners forfeited eight games from the 1972 season, the university now recognizes the wins and the Big Eight Conference championship won that year.

The Big Eight punished the team with a two-year bowl ban beginning in 1973 and a two-year ban on television appearances beginning in 1974. During the next three years, while the bans were in place, Oklahoma went 32–1–1 and won three straight conference championships. They claimed back-to-back national championships in 1974 and 1975, the two years in which they could not appear on television during the regular season. As it was a postseason game, NBC did air Oklahoma's 1976 Orange Bowl win over Michigan, which secured the team's fifth national championship.

Oklahoma performed exceptionally well during their probation. In 1973, the Sooners had seven ranked teams on their 11-game schedule and beat six of them, tying No. 1 USC and finishing the year undefeated. In 1974, the run-heavy wishbone offense averaged 43 points per game and set an FBS record that still stands with 73.91 rushing attempts per game. In both 1974 and 1975, the team had six players rush for over 300 yards, with Joe Washington earning All-America honors in both seasons as the team's rushing leader. Additionally, due to the frequency of quarterback rushes in the wishbone, signal caller Steve Davis rushed for more yards than he passed in both seasons.

Following the 1975 season, several key players left the team. Defensive tackle Lee Roy Selmon was selected first overall in the 1976 NFL Draft, and Washington was taken three picks later. Davis departed and was replaced at quarterback by Dean Blevins, who was unable to match his predecessor's contributions in the running game. In 1978, Oklahoma would get their third Heisman Trophy winner in running back Billy Sims, who rushed for 1,896 yards and broke the Big Eight regular season rushing record. The Sooners finished third in the final AP poll after an Orange Bowl victory over Nebraska, the closest they came to a national championship in the second half of the 1970s. Despite never losing more than two games in any season during the these years, Oklahoma never finished in the top two in the final AP poll.

During the 1970s, Switzer's teams went 73–7–2 in seven years, and the Sooners won the Big Eight every year from 1972 to 1980. However, during the early 1980s, the team's performance worsened. They lost four games each in 1981, 1982, and 1983. In 1984, the team improved to 9–2–1 and defeated Nebraska when the Cornhuskers were ranked No. 1 in the country. The win allowed Oklahoma to claim a share of the conference championship and receive an Orange Bowl bid against Washington, which they subsequently lost.

Switzer's teams returned to contention for the national championship during the next three seasons, earning an 11–1 record and a Big Eight title in each. However, in all three years, the Sooners lost to Miami, directly costing them the opportunity to win at least one championship. In 1985, the Sooners won the national championship despite their loss, rebounding to defeat top-ranked Penn State in the Orange Bowl. In 1986, the Sooners won another Orange Bowl but finished No. 3 behind Penn State and Miami, who had faced each other for the championship in the Fiesta Bowl with the Nittany Lions emerging victorious. 1987 saw the Sooners play in two No. 1 vs. No. 2 games in a row, defeating top-ranked Nebraska to end their regular season undefeated before facing Miami the Orange Bowl to decide the national title. No. 2 Miami defeated the Sooners, who had risen to the top of the polls following the Nebraska game, 20–14. In 1988, the Sooners finished 9–3, with highlights including a 70–24 win against Kansas State in which the team rushed for 768 yards, which remains an FBS record.

Switzer's tenure ended in scandal. After the 1988 season, the NCAA placed the Sooners on probation for violating several rules, including offering improper benefits to players and recruits. In one example, a recruit was offered $1,000 to enroll at the university. It was determined that Switzer had personally paid for rental cars for students entertaining recruits on campus. Meanwhile, several of his players were in trouble with the law. Despite knowing that certain players had problems with alcohol or drugs, Switzer had recruited them anyway due to their talent. Notable players Charles Thompson and Brian Bosworth were found to be involved with drugs or steroids. Switzer's home was robbed in 1989, and Thompson was alleged to be one of the burglars. On multiple occasions, players were caught attempting to sell cocaine to undercover agents. A shooting and a gang rape took place in the athletic dorm within eight days of each other; two players were later convicted for the rape. Former Sooner Jim Riley later said that amid the turmoil, "Barry was just trying to keep it together."

The probation lasted three years, including a two-year bowl ban, a one-year television ban, and a two-year reduction in scholarships. Facing immense pressure to resign, Switzer stepped down as head coach in 1989. He finished his tenure in Norman with a 157–29–4 record, an .837 winning percentage, 12 conference championships, and three national titles.

Gibbs, Schnellenberger, and Blake (1989–1998)
Switzer's ouster marked the beginning of what Stan Dorsey, writing for The Sporting News, called "a pratfall of unspeakable scope and unfathomable dimension" for the Sooners. Defensive coordinator Gary Gibbs was promoted to head coach. Dorsey characterized Gibbs as being uncomfortable around alumni and the media, as well as with being a head coach in general. During his six-year tenure, while Oklahoma attempted to recover from probation, the team finished a combined 44–23–2, never reaching higher than second in the conference or No. 16 in the final AP poll. Gibbs punctuated a middling record with losses to Oklahoma's rivals; the Sooners went a combined 2–15–1 against Texas, Nebraska, and Colorado during his tenure. He announced his resignation prior to the end of the 1994 season.

Gibbs was replaced by Howard Schnellenberger, whose resume included a national championship at Miami. Convinced that the 1994 Copper Bowl loss to BYU was "clearly the lowest point in the great history of Oklahoma football," Schnellenberger sought to reshape the program, beginning by ordering files from previous seasons to be thrown out. Instead, they were archived without his knowledge. Schnellenberger often said that "they will write books and make movies about my time [at Oklahoma]," and his first team started out well. The Sooners rose to No. 10 in the AP poll after three wins to begin the 1995 season, but a home loss to fourth-ranked Colorado started a 2–5–1 stretch to finish the year. The season ended with shutout losses to Oklahoma State and national champions Nebraska. Schnellenberger resigned after one season in Norman, having failed to live up to his own expectations for success.

Oklahoma then hired former player John Blake as head coach. Although he was Switzer's preferred candidate, Blake had very little experience, having never previously held a head coach or coordinator position. In the 101 years preceding Blake's hire, Oklahoma had nine losing seasons. Under Blake, the Sooners had three losing seasons in three years. The team's eight losses in 1996 set a team record that was matched the following season. Blake's 12–22 record gave him the worst winning percentage of any Oklahoma head coach since the single-game tenure of John A. Harts in 1895. He was fired after presiding over the worst three-year stretch in team history.

Despite his poor record as head coach, Blake contributed to success after his tenure by recruiting several players who would help achieve more favorable results for his successor. Future NFL players Roy Williams and Rocky Calmus were key starters on teams that returned the Sooners to national prominence under Bob Stoops.

Bob Stoops era (1999–2016)

Under pressure to find a head coach who would turn the program around, athletic director Joe Castiglione vetted each candidate personally. He eventually selected Stoops, then the defensive coordinator at Florida, who improved the Sooners to 7–5 in his first season.

Perennial BCS contention
Oklahoma began the 2000 season ranked No. 19 in the AP poll, their first preseason AP poll appearance in five years. After a 4–0 start, the Sooners defeated No. 11 Texas 63–14; running back Quentin Griffin broke a school record with six rushing touchdowns in the game. The next week, the Sooners beat No. 2 Kansas State 41–31, then defeated top-ranked Nebraska 31–14 two weeks later. The Sooners finished the regular season undefeated and beat Kansas State in the conference championship game to win their first conference title since 1987. In the years since that victory, the Big Eight had dissolved and the Sooners had joined its successor conference, the Big 12. Additionally, the BCS format had been established, with each season culminating in a national championship game between the top two teams in the system's rankings. Oklahoma was ranked No. 1 following the conference championship win and played Florida State in the Orange Bowl for the BCS title. The Sooners defeated the heavily favored Seminoles 13–2 to claim the school's seventh national championship. The team produced consensus All-Americans for the first time since 1988, including quarterback Josh Heupel, who finished runner-up for the Heisman in one of the closest votes in the award's history to that point.

The influence of John Blake's recruiting classes on the championship would be a difficult question for Stoops, even years after the title. More than half of the 2000 team's starters were recruited by Blake, although Stoops brought in the quarterback (Heupel) and running back (Griffin). Despite continued success throughout the rest of his tenure in Norman, Stoops never won another national championship after 2000.

The following years saw Oklahoma contend for conference and national championships while qualifying for major bowl games. In 2001, after rivalry losses to Nebraska and Oklahoma State, Oklahoma did not earn a spot in the conference championship game, but the Sooners were granted a Cotton Bowl Classic berth, their first in school history, against unranked Arkansas and won 10–3. In 2002, the Sooners won the Big 12 and advanced to the Rose Bowl for the first time, defeating No. 7 Washington State 34–14.

Oklahoma went undefeated in the regular season in both 2003 and 2004. 2003 included a 77–0 defeat of 2003 Texas A&M and a 65–13 defeat of Texas, the latter being the biggest win in Red River Showdown history. Led by Heisman Trophy winner Jason White, the team was ranked No. 1 in every AP poll of the season until an upset in the Big 12 Championship Game by Kansas State dropped them to third. However, the Sooners were ranked first in the BCS rankings and were thus able to play for the national championship in the Sugar Bowl. They were defeated 21–14 by LSU. White, a Tuttle, Oklahoma native, threw for 3,846 yards and 40 touchdowns in his Heisman campaign but was kept in check by the LSU defense, completing just over 35 percent of his passes and throwing two interceptions. The next year, freshman running back Adrian Peterson emerged as a star with 1,925 yards and 15 touchdowns on the ground. The AP, Coaches Poll, and BCS all ranked USC at No. 1 and Oklahoma at No. 2 in every poll of the season until the two undefeated conference champions met in the Orange Bowl for the national championship. Oklahoma would lose their second straight national championship game, and Peterson would finish second in Heisman voting behind USC quarterback Matt Leinart. Following the season, several key players departed as 10 Sooners were selected in the 2005 NFL Draft, more than any other school.

Postseason letdowns
The 2005 season saw Oklahoma fall out of the AP poll for the first time since the 1999 season en route to an 8–4 record and a Holiday Bowl victory over No. 6 Oregon. In both 2006 and 2007, the Sooners won the Big 12 but suffered upset losses in their bowl games. In the 2007 Fiesta Bowl, the Sooners lost a back-and-forth game in overtime when Boise State executed a Statue of Liberty play on a two-point conversion attempt to win 43–42. Oklahoma qualified for the Fiesta Bowl again the following year and were favored against West Virginia, however, a 48–28 loss ended their season.

Prior to the 2007 season, the NCAA announced sanctions due to violations committed by players on the 2005 team who had been paid for unperformed work at a Norman car dealership. The NCAA found Oklahoma guilty of a "failure to monitor" the improper employment benefits and punished the team by vacating its victories from the 2005 season. However, in 2008, the NCAA partially reversed its decision and reinstated the vacated wins.

At the end of the 2008 regular season, the Big 12 South finished in a three-way tie between Oklahoma, Texas, and Texas Tech, with each team having suffered one loss at the hands of another. As the team with the highest BCS ranking, Oklahoma advanced to the conference championship game on a tie-breaker. The Sooners won the game, and quarterback Sam Bradford won the Heisman Trophy. His 53 combined passing and rushing touchdowns are tied for the most ever in a Heisman campaign. The Sooners advanced to the BCS National Championship Game but were defeated by Florida.

Late Stoops era
After a Fiesta Bowl victory in 2010, the Sooners, led by Stoops and new co-offensive coordinator Josh Heupel, were ranked No. 1 in the polls to start the 2011 season. After maintaining their ranking for three weeks, the Sooners achieved their 100th No. 1 ranking in the AP poll, becoming the first team to accomplish the feat since the poll began in 1936.

2011 marked the final time that the Sooners were ranked No. 1 under Stoops. However, Oklahoma remained competitive throughout the rest of the BCS era, including a 2014 Sugar Bowl win over defending national champions Alabama in their last game before the introduction of the College Football Playoff. Under this system, four teams are selected to compete in yearly national semifinal games in which the winners advance to the national championship game. The Sooners received their first playoff birth in 2015 and subsequently lost 37–17 to Clemson in their semifinal game, the Orange Bowl. Despite winning the Big 12 in 2016, Oklahoma lost two regular season games and did not make the playoff. They defeated Auburn in the Sugar Bowl, 35–19.

In 2017, Stoops announced that he was stepping down as head coach, with offensive coordinator Lincoln Riley immediately appointed as his replacement. Stoops said that he felt that the time was right to retire, with a source indicating to Gene Wojciechowski of ESPN that Stoops wanted to leave on his own terms while he still could, without the university or his health forcing him to step aside. During his tenure in Norman, Stoops produced a 190–48 (.798) record, 10 conference titles, and a school-record 18 bowl game appearances. His 2008 team scored the most points in college football history to that point, averaging over 51 per game. In 2021, he was inducted into the College Football Hall of Fame.

Riley and Venables (2017–present)

In his first season, Riley led the Sooners to 12 wins, beating the 10-win record held by Chuck Fairbanks and Barry Switzer for most victories by a first-year coach in program history. The Sooners entered the playoff against Georgia in the Rose Bowl, losing 54–48 in double overtime. 2017 was the first of three consecutive 12–2 seasons for the Sooners under Riley, however, each ended in a College Football Playoff semifinal loss. As of the end of the 2022 season, Oklahoma has an 0–4 playoff record and more playoff appearances without a win than any other FBS team. However, the Sooners did win the 2017, 2018, 2019, and 2020 Big 12 Championship Games during Riley's tenure.

Under Riley, the Sooners had two consecutive Heisman Trophy winners who became No. 1 overall picks in the NFL Draft. In 2017, Baker Mayfield broke his own FBS record for single-season passing efficiency while throwing for over 4,600 yards and 43 touchdowns. He was selected first overall in the 2018 NFL Draft. The following season, ex-Texas A&M starter Kyler Murray topped Mayfield's passing efficiency mark and became the seventh Heisman winner in program history. He was selected first overall in the 2019 NFL Draft. To replace Murray for the 2019 season, Riley turned to ex-Alabama starter Jalen Hurts. The Sooners lost 63–28 to eventual national champion LSU in the Peach Bowl, and Hurts finished second in Heisman voting to LSU quarterback Joe Burrow. As of the end of the 2022 season, Mayfield, Murray, and Hurts collectively own four of the top 12 passing efficiency seasons in FBS history.

In July 2021, Oklahoma and Texas announced that they would leave the Big 12 for the Southeastern Conference (SEC) upon the conclusion of the Big 12's current media rights contracts, which are set to expire in 2025. The surprising move initiated a widespread wave of conference realignment that saw, among many other moves, Pac-12 teams USC and UCLA announce their intention to join the Big Ten. Oklahoma and Texas have been criticized for abandoning their historic conference roots and setting the stage for other teams to do so, thereby creating a landscape in which the SEC and Big Ten are poised to dominate the sport at the expense of other conferences. In February 2023, the two defecting universities negotiated a combined $100 million early termination fee with the Big 12 in order to leave the conference a year early, prior to the end of the media rights deals. Oklahoma and Texas are currently scheduled to begin SEC play in the 2024 season.

Prior to the end of the 2021 season, Riley accepted the head coach position at USC, becoming the first head coach to leave Oklahoma for a different job since Chuck Fairbanks in 1973. Chuck Carlton, writing for The Dallas Morning News, said that the departure "blindsided most of the college football world." During his tenure in Norman, Riley compiled a 55–10 (.846) record and achieved the highest winning percentage of any coach in program history. Bob Stoops was named interim head coach for the team's Alamo Bowl appearance and led the Sooners to a victory. Clemson defensive coordinator Brent Venables, who had once held the same position at Oklahoma under Stoops, was hired as Riley's replacement. In his first year at the helm, the Sooners finished 6–7, their season punctuated by a 49–0 loss to Texas, Oklahoma's worst loss in Red River Showdown history and the biggest shutout loss that the Sooners have ever suffered.

Conference affiliations
Oklahoma has been independent and a member of three conferences.
 Independent (1895–1914) 
 Southwest Conference (1915–1919) 
 Big Eight Conference (1920–1995) 
 Big 12 Conference (1996–present)
 Southeastern Conference (joining on July 1, 2024)

Championships

National championships
Oklahoma claims seven consensus national championships won by selection in the major college football polls. In addition, in ten years other than those seven championship seasons, Oklahoma has appeared atop lists by selectors designated by the NCAA as "major", primarily using math rating formulas.

Claimed national championships

Unclaimed national championships

In general, math formula rankings are not recognized as national championships.  For years other than the seven in which Oklahoma was selected by a major poll as national champion, the following created math rating systems that selected Oklahoma:
Richard Billingsley: 1915* 
Clyde P. Berryman: 1953*, 1957*, 1986*, 2003
Richard Poling: 1967, 1978 
Richard C. Dunkel, Sr.: 1973, 1978, 1980, 1986
Harry DeVold: 1973, 1978, 1986
Jeff Sagarin: 1973*, 1978, 1986
David Rothman: 1978
Edward Litkenhous: 1978 
Herman Matthews: 1978, 1980
The New York Times: 1986
Others:
own selection: Bill Schroeder 1978
member polling: College Football Researchers Association 1949* 1953*, 1973*, 1986

* retrospective selection

Conference championships
The team has captured 50 conference titles, including 14 in a row from 1946 to 1959.

† Co-championship

‡ Both Nebraska and Oklahoma claim the 1972 championship, despite Oklahoma in early 1973 forfeiting eight games from the 1972 season and the Big 8 crown.

Division championships
The Sooners have been a member of only one division, the Big 12 South, in their entire history. They were members from 1996 until 2010, after which the Big 12 ceased divisional play.

† Co-championship

Head coaches

The Sooners have had 23 head coaches in their history. The current head coach, Brent Venables, was hired on December 5, 2021. Since the first head coach, John A. Harts, guided the team for one game in 1895, the Sooners have played in more than 1,300 games. Four men have coached the team in more than 100 games; all of them have more than 100 wins at Oklahoma. Oklahoma is the only program with four 100-win coaches in its history. The coach with the highest winning percentage in school history is Lincoln Riley, who went 55–10 (.846) across five seasons. The lowest winning percentage aside from Harts, who lost his only game, belongs to John Blake, who went 12–22 (.353) across three seasons.

Ten coaches have led the Sooners to postseason bowl games: Tom Stidham, Jim Tatum, Bud Wilkinson, Gomer Jones, Chuck Fairbanks, Barry Switzer, Gary Gibbs, Bob Stoops, Riley, and Venables. Nine coaches have won conference championships with the Sooners: Bennie Owen, Stidham, Dewey Luster, Tatum, Wilkinson, Fairbanks, Switzer, Stoops, and Riley.

Wilkinson, Switzer, and Stoops have each received National Coach of the Year honors from at least one organization. Six Sooner coaches (Owen, Lawrence Jones, Tatum, Wilkinson, Switzer, and Stoops) have been inducted into the College Football Hall of Fame.

Coaching staff

Stadium

The Sooners play their home games at Gaylord Family Oklahoma Memorial Stadium also known as The Palace on the Prairie. The stadium was formerly called Oklahoma Memorial Stadium but the administration decided to add 'Gaylord Family' to recognize the contributions made by Edward K. Gaylord and his family over the years (estimated at over $50 million). The playing surface is called Owen Field after Bennie Owen, Oklahoma's coach from 1905 to 1926. The stadium was built in 1923 with an original capacity of 500. In 1925, 16,000 seats were added and 16,000 more seats were added in 1929 bringing the total capacity to 32,000. The stadium has had a natural grass playing surface for the majority of its existence. The stadium had an artificial turf from 1970 to 1994. The stadium had a major renovation in 2003 when a new upper deck was added to the east side of the stadium, adding over 8,400 new seats. The official seating capacity of the stadium, following renovations in 2015, is 83,489. which makes it the 15th largest college stadium in the U.S. and second largest in the Big 12 Conference. Despite the official capacity, the Sooners routinely average well above capacity, most recently 86,735 for the 2018 season. The largest crowd ever was 88,308 on November 11, 2017, against TCU.

Rivalries

Nebraska

Oklahoma's rivalry with the Nebraska Cornhuskers historically had national championship implications, with the winner usually advancing to the Orange Bowl. The teams often met on Thanksgiving. For the majority of the 20th century Oklahoma and Nebraska competed as part of the Big Eight Conference where from 1907 to 1995 the programs won a combined 77 conference titles. The teams are noted for playing in the Game of the Century, in 1971 which OU lost 35–31. In 1996, the teams joined the Big XII Conference when Nebraska joined the North Division, and Oklahoma joined the South Division, thus ending the annual match-ups between the programs in 1998 and 1999. In 2000 the series resumed with Nebraska and Oklahoma being ranked number one and two in the BCS rankings. OU won 31–14. Oklahoma leads the series 47–38–3. On September 18, 2021, Oklahoma  defeated Nebraska 23–16. Oklahoma beat Nebraska 49–14 on the last matchup on September 17, 2022.

Oklahoma State

Oklahoma leads the series 91–19–7 through the end of the 2022 season.

Texas

The Red River Showdown or the OU–Texas Game is the annual matchup in Dallas during the State Fair of Texas between Oklahoma and the Texas Longhorns. Since 1929, the game has been played annually at the Cotton Bowl, halfway between Norman and Austin. For the majority of the 20th century the game was a non-conference match-up. Texas competed in the Southwest Conference. In 1996, the two programs became part of the Big XII Conference South division. That year Oklahoma won the first overtime game of the series, after a tie the previous year. The stadium is split along the 50-yard line with Oklahoma fans occupying the south half of the field. Texas leads the series 63–50–5 through the end of the 2022 season.

Missouri

Oklahoma leads the inactive series 67–24–5. As of the end of the 2022 season, the most recent game in the series was played in 2011.

Pageantry

School colors

Oklahoma's official school colors are crimson and cream. These colors were picked in 1895 by May Overstreet, the only female faculty member at the time. The colors were her own personal choice and she decided on them after viewing many color samples and materials. After her decision, the colors were brought in front of the student body who enthusiastically approved of her selections. In recent years, red and white have sometimes replaced crimson and cream.

Mascot
Oklahoma has had several mascots. The first was a stray dog named Mex. Mex was found in Mexico during the Mexican Revolution by Mott Keys, an army hospital medic. Keys' company adopted the dog and Keys took the dog back to Hollis, Oklahoma when he completed his duty. When Keys was enrolled in the university, he took Mex with him to Norman. With his experience as an army medic, Keys landed a job with the football team and a residence at the Kappa Sigma fraternity house. Mex's main duty during games was to keep stray dogs from roaming the field. He wore a red sweater with a big "O" letter on the side. Mex received national attention in October 1924 when the Oklahoma football team lost a game against Drake University. Mex was lost when the team boarded a train in Arkansas City, Kansas. The media blamed the loss on the field on the loss of their mascot. Mex was found later by two Oklahoma graduates. Mex died of old age on April 30, 1928. The campus was closed and classes were canceled on the day of his funeral. He was buried in a casket somewhere under the stadium.

Never an official mascot, Little Red began appearing at games in 1953. He was an Indian who wore red tights, breech cloth and a war bonnet and was last portrayed by Randy Palmer.  In April 1970, Little Red was banished by Oklahoma president John Herbert Hollomon, Jr. The student court issued a temporary restraining order to keep Little Red from appearing at Sooner games. Despite this order, Palmer showed up as Little Red for the 1970 season opener where he was met with cheers from the crowd. When Palmer was drafted after the 1971 season, no one showed up for try-outs to replace him.

The mascot for Oklahoma is the Sooner Schooner, a conestoga wagon similar to the primary method of transportation used by early settlers in Oklahoma. The Schooner is maintained and driven by members of the RUF/NEKS, the university's all-male spirit organization, along with two white ponies named Boomer and Sooner. In 2005, the university also introduced two costumed mascots also named Boomer and Sooner to serve as mascots for football games and events that do not permit a covered wagon.

Music
The official fight song of the Sooners is "Boomer Sooner."  This song is played frequently at football games and is played by the band after touchdowns, field goals, after significant plays, and when the team or crowd need a boost of energy.  "OK Oklahoma" is another school song that is played after an extra point and when the Sooner Schooner rolls onto the field.  The official Alma Mater song is the "OU Chant", which is sung by OU fans before sporting events and at ceremonial occasions.  Other tunes frequently heard at OU football games include the state song "Oklahoma" and "Fight for OKU."

The Pride of Oklahoma Marching Band is a nationally renowned ensemble founded in 1904.  The largest student organization on campus, the band performs at all home games and frequently travels to other games.  The band holds a game ball from the Bedlam Series game in 1983, the day "the Pride" won.

Awards

Heisman Trophy
The Heisman Trophy is awarded annually to the nation's most outstanding college football player. Seven Oklahoma players have won the Heisman Trophy, six more finished runner-up. Kyler Murray is the most recent winner having won the 2018 Heisman Trophy.

Other awards

All-Americans

Every year, several publications release rosters of the best college football players in the country. The athletes on these lists are referred to as All-Americans. The NCAA recognizes five All-American lists. They are the Associated Press, American Football Coaches Association, Football Writers Association of America, The Sporting News, and the Walter Camp Football Foundation. A consensus All-American is typically defined as a player who is named to three or more lists. Oklahoma has had 167 first-team All-Americans in its history, with 82 of them being named consensus All-Americans.

College Football Hall of Fame
Oklahoma has 29 inductees in the College Football Hall of Fame. The first was coach Bennie Owen, who was inducted as part of the inaugural class in 1951. The most recent is Roy Williams, who was inducted in 2022.

Future non-conference opponents
Announced non-conference schedules as of October 8, 2022.

*Opponent becomes intra-conference opponent with Oklahoma's impending move to the Southeastern Conference.

See also
 The Pride of Oklahoma Marching Band
 RUF/NEKS
 OU Chant
 List of Oklahoma Sooners in the NFL Draft
 Play Like a Champion Today
 Heisman Trophy

Notes

References

Further reading

External links

 

 
American football teams established in 1895
1895 establishments in Oklahoma Territory